The Mazatlán Open was a men's professional golf tournament held at Mazatlán, Sinaloa, Mexico as part of PGA Tour Latinoamérica. The tournament was first held in 2014 and the inaugural winner was Tyler McCumber.

Winners

References

External links
Coverage on PGA Tour Latinoamérica's official site

PGA Tour Latinoamérica events
Golf tournaments in Mexico
Sport in Sinaloa
Mazatlán
Spring (season) events in Mexico
Recurring sporting events established in 2014
Recurring sporting events disestablished in 2016
2014 establishments in Mexico
2016 disestablishments in Mexico